Dativare Fort / Hira Dongar is a fort located 72 km from Vasai, in  Palghar district, of Maharashtra. The Fort is located on a small hillock and at commanding point for guarding the trade route along the Vaitarna River, which runs till, Arnala Fort. This was a busy route in medieval times.

History
Very little is known of the fort's history, other than that it was probably built by Portuguese.

How to reach
The nearest town is Saphale which is 107 km (66 mi) from Mumbai  by rail. The base village of the fort is Datiware or Dantiware, which is 15-20 km (9-12 mi) from Saphale by road. There are good hotels at Saphale and Edwan. Now tea and snacks are also available in small hotels along the coastal road. The trekking path starts from the hillock north of the Dativare village. Now there is very safe and wide road up to the fort. It takes about half an hour to reach the entrance gate of the fort.

Places to see
There are few walls and ruined bastions of the fort left to visit.

See also 
 List of forts in Maharashtra
 List of forts in India
 Marathi People
 Portuguese India
 Maratha Navy
 List of Maratha dynasties and states
 Battles involving the Maratha Empire

References 

Buildings and structures of the Maratha Empire
Forts in Ratnagiri district
16th-century forts in India
Tourist attractions in Konkan
Former populated places in India